John Sevier is a bronze sculpture depicting the American politician of the same name by Belle Kinney and Leopold Scholz, installed in the United States Capitol's National Statuary Hall, in Washington, D.C., as part of the National Statuary Hall Collection. The statue was gifted by the U.S. state of Tennessee in 1931.

References

External links

 

1931 establishments in Washington, D.C.
Bronze sculptures in Washington, D.C.
Monuments and memorials in Washington, D.C.
Sevier, John
Sculptures of men in Washington, D.C.
Governor of Tennessee